Jovel Martins (born 15 August 1990) is an Indian professional footballer who plays as a defender for Churchill Brothers in the I-League.

Career

Sporting Clube de Goa
In June 2011 Martins signed for Sporting Clube de Goa who play in the I-League. He then made his debut for Sporting Goa on 23 October 2011 against Prayag United in the I-League.

Career statistics

Club

References

Indian footballers
1990 births
Living people
I-League players
Sporting Clube de Goa players
Footballers from Goa
Association football midfielders
Indian Super League players
FC Goa players